Dorothy Vera Margaret Bishop  (born 14 February 1952) is a British psychologist specialising in developmental disorders specifically, developmental language impairments. She is Professor of Developmental Neuropsychology and Wellcome Trust Principal Research Fellow in the Department of Experimental Psychology at the University of Oxford, where she has been since 1998. Bishop is Principal Investigator for the Oxford Study of Children's Communication Impairments (OSCCI). She is a supernumary fellow of St John's College, Oxford.

Early life and education
Bishop was born on 14 February 1952. In 1973, she earned a Bachelor of Arts degree with Honours in Experimental Psychology from St Hugh's College, University of Oxford. In 1975, she completed her Master of Philosophy in Clinical Psychology at the University of London. In 1978, Bishop completed her Doctor of Philosophy at University of Oxford.

While studying for her undergraduate degree, Bishop developed an interest in cognitive disorders. After her MPhil, she returned to Oxford to work with Freda Newcombe at the Neuropsychology Unit in Radcliffe Infirmary. The careful direction provided by Newcombe steered Bishop towards cases of children with developmental language disorders. This direction launched her career as a developmental neuropsychologist.

Research and career
Bishop conducts research into Psychology, Neuroscience, Language and Developmental disorders. She is one of the co-founders of the video-led campaign, RALLI, which aims to develop awareness of language learning impairments including Specific language impairment.

Bishop has published some of her academic work as D.V.M. Bishop. This is to avoid any prejudices that may be held against her as a female academic. Her publications include Language development in exceptional circumstances (1988), Handedness and developmental disorders (1990), and Uncommon understanding (1997).

Bishop's research is extensive as she helped to build and develop the developmental language impairment field.

Dorothy Bishop, occasionally published as DVM Bishop, is Professor of Developmental Neuropsychology at the University of Oxford. Bishop, funded by the Wellcome Trust, leads a series of research of children's communication disorders. Unlike many of her contemporaries, Bishop's interests are wide spread, deviating from neuropsychology, towards behavior genetics, auditory processing, hemispheric specialization, specific language disorders, autism, and dyslexia.

Many of today's assessment methods for children's language were generated by Bishop including the Test for Reception of Grammar and the Children's Communication Checklist. Her research has been funded by the Medical Research Council (MRC) and the Wellcome Trust.

Children's Communication Checklist 
In 1998, Bishop created what she called the Children's Communication Checklist (CCC). The goal of the CCC was to help diagnose children who did not have an apparent reason for communication errors. The CCC specifically looked to identify pragmatic language and specific language impairments. The CCC allowed Bishop and other researchers to reliably identify language impairments but give clues to other potential disorders which may not have been apparent such as high functioning autism, attention deficit hyperactivity disorder, or Williams syndrome. A second, updated, edition of the CCC was released in 2001.

Bishop has done significant groundbreaking work on Specific Language Impairment and Pragmatic Language Impairment. She is often an unsung hero in her research and contribution as she often pairs with other scholars in her various studies.

Bishop's inquiry and interest in language impairments continues as she tries to understand children's developmental language issues.

CATALISE 
When Bishop began her studies of cognitive disorders, research to language development was relatively limited. Though more research has been conducted, there is not a cohesive framework of research for specialists to rely on when assessing and diagnosing children with language disorders. In 2016, Bishop began a multiple part Delphi project. In this particular project, Bishop is attempting to define a set criteria for identifying children who may need intervention through a multinational and multidiscipline study. In the first phase of this study, 59 experts of various fields such as education, speech-language therapy, and pediatrics from different countries such New Zealand, the United Kingdom, and United States of America participated in this study to provide a range of expertise and experience. The researchers submitted findings to a panel who agreed with an 80% consensus. In phase two of this project, similar parameters were followed to determine what terminology should be accepted in studies and treatment.

RALLI 
Because of her intense study of children's language impairments, Bishop co-founded RALLI. RALLI is an advocacy group with an intent to Raise Awareness of Learning Language Impairments. An underfunded group, their blog turned webpage provide an extensive series of information from videos to articles about Language Learning Impairments and where parents, teachers, and children can find help. Bishop and her fellow researchers have a YouTube channel for RALLI which details what language impairments are, how often they occur, and when to find help. The blog has not been updated since 2013.

Awards and honours
Bishop was elected a Fellow of the Royal Society (FRS) in 2014 for "substantial contributions to the improvement of natural knowledge". Her nomination reads:

Bishop is also a Fellow of the British Academy (FBA) and a Fellow of the Academy of Medical Sciences (FMedSci). She has honorary degrees from Lund University, the University of Western Australia and the University of Newcastle upon Tyne.

Personal life
Bishop married Patrick Rabbitt in 1976. As "Deevy Bishop", Bishop has written several humorous crime novels for Amazon Kindle.

Bishop is an avid blogger which demonstrates her interests beyond language impairments. The blog received the runner up recognition for the Good Thinking Society: UK Science Blog Prize 2012.

References

1952 births
Living people
20th-century British scientists
20th-century British women scientists
21st-century British scientists
21st-century British women scientists
British psychologists
British women psychologists
Academics of the University of Oxford
Fellows of the Royal Society
Fellows of the British Academy
Fellows of the Academy of Medical Sciences (United Kingdom)
Alumni of St Hugh's College, Oxford
Female Fellows of the Royal Society
Wellcome Trust Principal Research Fellows